The 2017–18 Buffalo Bulls women's basketball team represented the University at Buffalo during the 2017–18 NCAA Division I women's basketball season. The Bulls, led by sixth-year head coach Felisha Legette-Jack, played their home games at Alumni Arena as members of the East Division of the Mid-American Conference. They finished the season 29–6, 16–2 in MAC play to win MAC East Division. They advanced to the championship game of the MAC women's tournament where they lost to Central Michigan. They received an at-large bid to the NCAA women's tournament where they upset South Florida in the first round to win their first NCAA tournament game in school history, Florida State in the second round to advanced to the sweet sixteen for the first time in school history. They lost to South Carolina. With 29 wins, they finished with the most wins in school history.

Roster

Schedule

|-
!colspan=9 style=| Exhibition

|-
!colspan=9 style=| Non-conference regular season

|-
!colspan=9 style=| MAC regular season

|-
!colspan=9 style=| MAC Women's Tournament

|-
!colspan=9 style=| NCAA Women's Tournament

Rankings
2017–18 NCAA Division I women's basketball rankings

See also
2017–18 Buffalo Bulls men's basketball team

References

Buffalo
Buffalo Bulls women's basketball seasons
Buffalo
Buffalo Bulls
Buffalo Bulls